New World is the third album by The Zombies, recorded in 1990.  Several tracks were released in Europe in 1990 on an album called The Return of the Zombies.  This album features numerous tracks from that release that were remixed or re-recorded, as well as new tracks, and was released in April 1991.  According to the liner notes, it was recorded primarily to protect the name of the band in response to numerous groups of imposters that were then touring the US. Original members Rod Argent and Paul Atkinson were unavailable to join them for more than one track each.

The album was originally issued in the UK on RCA but never obtained a US release. RCA issued it on CD and later reissued on Ace's Big Beat label.

Track listing

Personnel
The Zombies
 Colin Blunstone - lead vocals
 Chris White - bass, vocals
 Hugh Grundy - drums
 Sebastian Santa Maria - keyboards, guitar, vocals

Special Guests
 Paul Atkinson - guitar on "New World (My America)"
 Rod Argent - keyboards on "Time of the Season"

With:
 Tim Renwick - guitar
 John Woolloff - guitar
 Laurie Wisefield - guitar
 Duncan Browne - guitar
 Claude Nobs - harmonica

References

The Zombies albums
1991 albums
Albums produced by David Richards (record producer)
RCA Records albums